Kama Kol (also Romanized as Kamā Kol) is a village in Pir Bazar Rural District, in the Central District of Rasht County, Gilan Province, Iran. At the 2006 census, its population was 775, in 211 families.

References 

Populated places in Rasht County